Sharp Stick is a 2022 American comedy film written, directed, and produced by Lena Dunham. It stars Kristine Froseth, Jon Bernthal, Luka Sabbat, Scott Speedman, Dunham, Ebon Moss-Bachrach, Taylour Paige, and Jennifer Jason Leigh. The film premiered at the Sundance Film Festival on January 22, 2022, and was released theatrically in the United States on July 29, 2022, by Utopia. It received mixed reviews from critics. It was released on VOD on August 16, 2022.

Premise
26-year-old babysitter Sarah Jo, who had a radical hysterectomy at age 15, loses her virginity to her employer, Josh, a married man.

Cast
 Kristine Froseth as Sarah Jo
 Jon Bernthal as Josh
 Luka Sabbat as Arvin
 Scott Speedman as Vance Leroy
 Lena Dunham as Heather
 Ebon Moss-Bachrach as Yuli
 Taylour Paige as Treina
 Jennifer Jason Leigh as Marilyn
 Tommy Dorfman as Tali
 Janicza Bravo as Mercedes

Production

In April 2020, Lena Dunham moved from London to Silver Lake, Los Angeles, in the midst of the COVID-19 pandemic. She passed the time watching a number of films from the 1970s, including Belle de Jour, A Woman Under the Influence, Remember My Name, and An Unmarried Woman. The films, as well as the impact of a hysterectomy, motivated Dunham to write, direct, and star in Sharp Stick. "It was about processing my life. And then, obviously, it becomes about the characters — and not about you at all." After receiving the script, Jon Bernthal and Jennifer Jason Leigh were immediately on board to star. Taylour Paige, however, was initially hesitant with joining the cast: "If I'm being honest. I was like, 'Don't you think this character was written as a white person?" Dunham convinced Paige to star by telling her that she had written the part with her in mind.

With an all-female production crew, filming took place in secret in Atwater Village and Eagle Rock, Los Angeles, in early 2021. According to lead actress Kristine Froseth, "There was a good energy all around. We had an amazing intimacy coordinator. Everything was choreographed — no surprises." In March 2021, the film was presented to buyers at the 71st Berlin International Film Festival. In August 2021, Tommy Dorfman was confirmed to star. Dunham's husband Luis Felber composed the musical score.

Release
The film premiered virtually at the 2022 Sundance Film Festival on January 22. In an interview, Dunham said "There are many greater tragedies than me not getting to see my movie premiere but I was so excited for my cast to get to see it together. We did it on such a small scale, and everyone really brought everything to it. It was such a harkening back to how I started. But we're planning a Zoom party. I guess people Zoomed into my wedding — and they'll Zoom into my premiere." In February 2022, Utopia acquired the film's distribution rights. It was released in theaters on July 29, 2022.

Reception

References

External links
 

American independent films
Films directed by Lena Dunham
2020s English-language films
2022 independent films
2020s American films